Tabounsou FC is a football (soccer) club from Guinea. They are members of the Guinée Championnat National.

References 

Football clubs in Guinea